Naisten Ykkönen (Women's First/One) is the second highest division of women's football in Finland. It is overseen by the Suomen Palloliitto (Football Association of Finland). Teams in Naisten Ykkönen can gain promotion to the top-tier Kansallinen Liiga or be relegated to the third-tier Naisten Kakkonen. At the conclusion of the 2019 season, PK-35 Vantaa gained promotion to the Kansallinen Liiga as champions of the Naisten Ykkönen and PK-35 gained promotion by winning the promotion/relegation series against IK Myran.  Conversely, GBK Kokkola and Ilves/2, were relegated to the Naisten Kakkonen at the conclusion of the 2019 season.

History 
The league was founded in 1984 as the Naisten I divisioona (Women's Division 1). The league was preceded by the Naisten perussarja (Women's Base Series), which played during 1973–1980, and the Naisten aluesarja (Women's Regional Series), which played during 1981–1983. Naisten I divisioona was renamed “Naisten Ykkönen” in 1996.

Format 
Naisten Ykkönen comprises twelve teams per season. The teams play in a double round-robin series for a total of 22 rounds. The top ranked team at the end of the season gains promotion to the Kansallinen Liiga, unseating the tenth (last) ranked team of the Kansallinen Liiga which is relegated to Naisten Ykkönen. The second ranked team in the Naisten Ykkönen and the ninth ranked team of the Kansallinen Liiga face off in a best of three series, the winner of which gains promotion to/remains in the Kansallinen Liiga and the loser remains in/is relegated to the Naisten Ykkönen. The Naisten Ykkönen teams in eleventh and twelfth position at the end of the season are relegated to the Naisten Kakkonen and replaced by the top two teams of the Naisten Kakkonen for the next season. In total, three or four teams are changed from one season to the next.

2020 season
The start of the 2020 Naisten Ykkönen season was delayed by the COVID-19 pandemic and there was some concern early on that the season may need to be cancelled. However, the concerns were not realized and on 15 May 2020, the Football Association of Finland announced that the 2020 Naisten Ykkönen season would be played with a modified format, a single round-robin series (11 matches) and three regional blocks of four teams, played as a double round-robin series (6 matches), for a total of 17 rounds.

Teams 2020 
TN is the standard Finnish abbreviation for artificial turf

Source: Suomen Palloliitto

References
Content in this article is translated from the existing Finnish Wikipedia article at :fi:Naisten Ykkönen; see its history for attribution.

External links 
Naisten Ykkönen on the Suomen Palloliitto site

2
Sports leagues established in 1984
Fin
1984 establishments in Finland
Professional sports leagues in Finland